A by-election was held for the Australian House of Representatives seat of Kalgoorlie on 16 November 1940. This was triggered by the death of Labor MP Albert Green.

The by-election was won by Labor candidate Herbert Johnson.

Results

References

1940 elections in Australia
Western Australian federal by-elections
1940s in Western Australia